Sepiadarium auritum is a species of cuttlefish native to the eastern Indian Ocean off northwestern Australia.

The type specimen measures 11 mm in mantle length.

The type specimen was collected near Hermite Island, Monte Bello Islands, Western Australia. It is deposited at The Natural History Museum in London.

References

External links

Cuttlefish
Molluscs described in 1914
Cephalopods of Oceania
Fauna of Western Australia